Christoph Lang (born 7 January 2002) is an Austrian professional football player who plays for SV Ried on loan from Sturm Graz.

Club career 
Christoph Lang made his professional debut for Sturm Graz on the 17 July 2021, replacing Kelvin Yeboah and scoring a gol in a 9-0 Austrian Cup away win against ATSV Stadl-Paura.

After featuring infrequently for Sturm Graz's first team, Lang was sent out on loan to SV Ried for six months in January 2023.

References

External links

2002 births
People from Deutschlandsberg District
Footballers from Styria
Living people
Austrian footballers
Austria under-21 international footballers
Association football forwards
SK Sturm Graz players
SV Ried players
Austrian Football Bundesliga players
2. Liga (Austria) players
Austrian Regionalliga players